The 1965 Gator Bowl (December) was a college football postseason bowl game that featured the Georgia Tech Yellow Jackets and the Texas Tech Red Raiders.

Background
Georgia Tech tied Vanderbilt, lost to Texas A&M, Tennessee and Georgia in their 2nd season as an independent. This was Georgia Tech's fourth bowl game of the decade along with their four Gator Bowl in nine years. The Red Raiders finished 2nd in the Southwest Conference, with their only losses being to #3 Texas and #2 Arkansas. This was the second bowl appearance of the Red Raiders in the decade, along with their first Gator Bowl appearance since 1954.

Game summary
Georgia Tech – Giles Smith, 2 yard touchdown run (Bunky Henry kick)
Georgia Tech – Safety
Georgia Tech – Lenny Snow, 1 yard touchdown run (Henry kick)
Texas Tech – Donny Anderson, 1 yard touchdown run (Gill kick)
Texas Tech – Jerry Shipley, 15 yard touchdown pass from Wilson (Gill kick)
Georgia Tech – Jerry Priestly, 1 yard touchdown run (Priestly run)
Georgia Tech – Ed Varner, 13 yard touchdown run (Henry kick)

Lenny Snow rushed for 136 yards on 35 carries for Georgia Tech. Donny Anderson rushed for 85 yards on 13 carries, while catching 9 passes for 138 yards. Georgia Tech had 10 more first downs than Tech (27 to 17), 364 rushing yards to the Red Raiders' 113, while being outpassed 283 to 77. Texas Tech turned the ball over five times; Georgia Tech turned it over just twice.

Statistics

Aftermath
Dodd would coach one more bowl game before his retirement in 1967. Georgia Tech did not reach the Gator Bowl again until 1999. Texas Tech did not make another bowl game until 1970, or reach the Gator Bowl until 1973.

References

Gator Bowl
Gator Bowl
Georgia Tech Yellow Jackets football bowl games
Texas Tech Red Raiders football bowl games
December 1965 sports events in the United States
1965 in sports in Florida